Charlie Brown's Roundabout is a large roundabout in South Woodford for lesser arterial roads and is a local landmark name for the motorway access flyovers above.

Layout and unconnected flyovers
Southwest is the nearby settlement, South Woodford, part of London since 1965. The Roding, a traditional boundary, is east of the roundabout.

The roundabout is for a restricted access North Circular junction, east of its course, with lesser roads: Southend Road and Chigwell Road: to north, east and south. Overhead are flyovers of the west-facing (North London), as opposed to south-facing (East London) southern end of the M11 motorway. The flyovers and the western approach to the roundabout access solely the North London aspects of the North Circular, which changes axis – to run south – west of the roundabout.

The nascent M11 and the North Circular merge at the next interchange south, the Redbridge Roundabout, (or, specifically, via a long spur north of that, for access to the northbound M11) that is the point of local interface with the North Circular's East London axis.

History

Toponymy

The roundabout is named after the landlord of the 20th century-founded pub, The Roundabout, that was demolished in 1972 when the roundabout was enlarged to allow sliproads for the new motorway. The landlord's father, also Charlie Brown (1859–1932), was the landlord of the minor museum-containing Railway Tavern, locally known as Charlie Brown's (pub) in Limehouse, in the London Docklands, a few miles south; taken over by his daughter; Charles junior vacated the opposing rival pub, the Blue Posts, in about 1938 to take on The Roundabout, in Woodford.

Formation of a junction
One road here pre-dates the early 20th century, Chigwell Road. Today's roundabout replaces a section of that road, part of the old course of the river, and small parts of three fields. Its southwest sits on the site of Roding Cottage which included a commercial rose nursery in its .

References

External links 
http://www.british-history.ac.uk/report.aspx?compid=46477
https://web.archive.org/web/20131029192101/http://www.britannia.com/travel/london/cockney/cbrown.html
http://eastlondonhistory.com/2010/11/07/charlie-browns-pub/

Road junctions in London
Roundabouts in England